Paul Christie may refer to:

 Paul Christie (politician) (born 1952), municipal politician and administrator in Ontario, Canada
 Paul Christie (musician) (born 1953), Australian bassist and vocalist
 Paul Christie (cricketer) (born 1971), former English cricketer
 Paul Christie (voice actor) (born 1951), American actor and voice actor

See also
 Paul Christy (1939–2021), American professional wrestler